Yuracmarca or Yuraq Marka (Quechua yuraq white, marka village, "white village") is one of 10 districts of the Huaylas Province in the Ancash Region of Peru. The capital of the district is the village of Yuracmarca.

Geography
The district is located in the eastern part of the province at an elevation of 1,518m, 122 km from the regions capital Huaraz and 55 km from the province's capital Caraz.

The Cordillera Blanca traverses the province. Some of the highest mountains of the district are listed below:

Political division
The Caraz District is divided into 1 village, 4 hamlets (singular: caserío) and 29 (singular: anexo):

Hamlets
 El Cruce
 Taruc Arca
 Quitaracza
 Santa Rosa

Ethnic groups 
The people in the district are mainly indigenous citizens of Quechua descent. Quechua is the language which the majority of the population (50.35%) learnt to speak in childhood, 49.19% of the residents started speaking using the Spanish language (2007 Peru Census).

See also 
 Pukaqucha
 Quyllurqucha
 Wiqruqucha

References

External links
  Official web site of the Yuracmarca district

Districts of the Huaylas Province
Districts of the Ancash Region